Joseph Andrew Nash (born October 11, 1960) is a former professional American football player. He played his entire career with the Seattle Seahawks of the National Football League from 1982 to 1996. Originally a nose tackle for seven seasons, Nash switched to defensive tackle in 1989. He was signed as an undrafted free agent by the Seahawks in 1982 from Boston College and went on to play in a Seahawks-record 218 career games over 15 seasons.

In 1984 he received Pro Bowl and All-Pro honors on the way to helping the Seattle Seahawks post a then team record of 12-4. He played alongside several other talented players on Seattle's defensive line, most notably Hall of Fame tackle Cortez Kennedy and All-Pro defensive end Jacob Green.

References

1960 births
Living people
American football defensive tackles
Boston College Eagles football players
Seattle Seahawks players
American Conference Pro Bowl players
Players of American football from Boston
Ed Block Courage Award recipients